Paul David Wilson (born August 30, 1952) is a songwriter, composer, conductor, and music producer. Most of his professional life has been devoted to music, including composing for radio and TV commercials. He became the president of a start-up record label begun by Frank Thomas, who was then the starring player on the Chicago White Sox baseball team. Wilson suffered a massive and debilitating stroke when he was 46 years old. Due to the terribly limiting effects of aphasia, a common but complicated and severe post-stroke condition, he was for a number of years unable to communicate without great difficulty. His fight back to full functioning has been a decade-long challenge that, although largely successful, in many ways still continues.

Biography

Early life 

Paul David Wilson was born in Chicago, Illinois. He was third son to father, Herbert, a classical tenor vocalist and choir director who taught elementary school and retired after becoming a vice-principal of the school.  Wilson's mother, Odessa, was a child prodigy who grew to become a concert pianist and choir director.  She was accomplished in a variety of music genres, but due to her commitment to God, only performed certain styles of music.  Wilson's early lessons on piano came from his mother, and he grew up absorbing the classical and gospel music of the choirs and vocal ensembles his parents directed.

While still of pre-school age, Wilson began composing simple songs and by the time he began primary school had learned to musically notate the songs he composed.  At age 12, Wilson began organizing "street corner" vocal ensembles to perform his songs at parties and selected school functions.  At 13, he discovered the flute and it soon became his major instrument. Wilson attended James H. Bowen High School in Chicago. In Wilson's fourth year of high school, a friend, Arlene Johnson, persuaded him to run for class president.  He was elected Senior Class President of Bowen in 1970.

He remembers the day when he was a still-young teenager and "my mother dragged me to a seminar on how to create commercial jingles." The presenters were Dick Marx, whose young son would later become a pop music star known as Richard Marx, who was then Chicago's most prominent master of music for Radio and TV commercials,  and Dr. Thomas Fabish, the concert master of DePaul University’s music department. The presentation involved a big band, top-notch singers and a film. Even as he listened, Wilson was thinking, "I could do that."

Inspired by Primous Fountain III, a young composer at DePaul University, Wilson enrolled and majored in music composition and theory.  He studied music composition with Dr. Leon Stein, Dr. Phil Winsor and Darlene Cowles, while taking flute with Philip Seeburg and Joseph Kainz.  In 1973, he was one of 20 music students from around the U.S. selected by Ron Logan of Walt Disney Entertainment to participate in a professional "work experience." Wilson remembers it as one of the major highlights of his college career. He wrote at that time in August 1973:

 

During his study at DePaul, he founded, performed in, and composed for many ensembles and often organized concerts and productions that featured works by him and others. In his senior year, Wilson was honored by inclusion in "Who's Who Among Students in American Universities & Colleges" and graduated in 1975 with a B.A. in music composition and theory.

Career 

In May 1974, while a senior at DePaul, he landed part-time employment at "Star Point 7," a music production company founded by Chuck Colbert, a producer/musician with a jazz-rock band, American Breed ("Bend Me, Shape Me"). Wilson started this "job" as an unpaid go-fer, answering phones and doing basic clerical chores. After two months, Wilson was eager for a chance to show what he could contribute and saw the situation as an opportunity.  "Chuck and his writing partner had parted ways and he needed someone to help finish a project. I was around and available and had the skills. I had to ask him, what are you waiting for?" Once Wilson had called attention to his talents, Colbert began using him as a composer and arranger.

A short time later, in the Summer of 1974, Wilson met a young musician who was just completing his military service, Danny Leake. At the time, Danny was a talented songwriter and electric guitar player, but would later become one of America's foremost recording studio engineers and one of Wilson's closest and most frequent collaborators.

In the Fall of 1975, Danny played a significant role in Wilson's life by introducing him to Ian Levine, a producer and songwriter, who was a celebrated member of the European black music fan base known as the Northern Soul scene. In 1975, while working with Ian, Wilson composed, arranged and produced for Dance, R&B and Northern Soul recording artists, in the course of which he traveled in the U.S. and England.  One of the Levine's artists, Evelyn Thomas, scored a chart hit with her first single, reaching the UK Top 30 in 1976 with the single "Weak Spot," and "which was (co-written and) arrangement by Paul."   As the writer, Neil Rushton, wrote in a review which appeared in Black Echoes, "Paul put the incredible zinging, scurrying strings in "Your Magic Put A Spell In Me"  performed by [L.J Johnson Ian Levine] for Ian Levine productions and also served as the songwriter and arranger for the "1976 Disco classic, originally sung by James Wells, called "Baby I'm Still The Same Man."

Despite the success and trans-Atlantic travel he was experiencing, Wilson still lived at home with his mother and father. One day in early 1976, while diligently making "cold calls" from his parents’ basement in hopes of drumming up some fresh music opportunities, Wilson found himself talking to Jerry Butler, a fellow Chicagoan who was already well known in American soul music. Butler had (with Curtis Mayfield) been one of the original founding members of The Impressions and then established a long later career as a celebrated solo artist.  That lucky phone call not only gave Wilson a chance to meet Butler, but soon led to the opportunity to work with him on a few projects, including three albums "Suite For The Single Girl",  "It All Comes Out In My Song" (title song) and Thelma (Houston) & Jerry for the Motown label.  Subsequently, Wilson and Butler they produce an album on Dee Dee Sharp-Gample with Philadelphia International.  Billboard said, "writer/co-producer Paul Wilson's "Invitation" is a regal, touching trumph that alone would have made for worthwhile album."  In 1981 with "Breaking and Entering" / "Easy Money," from Sharp-Gamble's album "Dee Dee", Wilson's production spent four weeks at number one on the Hot Dance Music/Club Play chart and Dance Chart Billboard.

Burrell Communications Group, LLC 

After two years of working with Chuck Colbert and learning the myriad business-related details one must to be successful in commercial music production, in 1976, at age 24, Wilson founded Herschel Commercial, Inc ("I just named it Hershel Commercial, Inc. because it rhymed, he notes) with Maurice Earl, Arlene Johnson and, later, Bruce Montgomery.  His first client was Chicago-based Burrell Communications Group, LLC, founded by Tom Burrell.  Although Anna Morris, the creative director of Burrell, thought Wilson might benefit from a little more "seasoning" before going out on his own, he proclaimed with great certainty, "Look, I'm ready!" Now, as impressed with his confidence as with his talents, Morris awarded him a package of several arranging spots to produce for Coca-Cola. The tracks featured Kitty Heywood, a sweet-voiced soul singer who had already performed on a number of albums as well as commercials. Once produced, the spots were enthusiastically received, both at the ad agency and at the client. Wilson was soon creating and producing a long list of memorable and award-winning spots for Burrell and many other ad agencies, often working with such established artists as: Phyllis Hyman, Lena Horne, Anita Baker, Midnight Star, Walter Jackson, The Dells, Peabo Bryson, Ada Dyer Vickie Winans, Tramaine Hawkins, The Bar-Kays, Valerie Simpson, Joshie Jo Armstead, Millie Jackson and Rufus Thomas.

Also of note is the score Wilson composed for a television film "Happy Birthday, Martin" sung by Joshie Jo Armstead, which is on permanent display at the King Center in Atlanta.

Leo Burnett Worldwide 

In 1977, a chance meeting at a barbershop brought Wilson to the attention of Don Richards, a young vice-president and account executive at Leo Burnett Worldwide, Chicago's largest and most celebrated advertising agency. Richards had been hired to facilitate Burnett's efforts to identify promising new African American staffers and suppliers, so he was ready to talk business even on a weekend trip to his barber. On hearing the young composer's story, Richards handed him a card, saying, "Call me... next week."  Wilson made sure he called Richards.  That meeting was most fortunate for Wilson and for Herschel. It set them on the path to success and helped establish their reputation with even the biggest and best clients, which included such major brand names as Kraft, Quaker Oats, Campbell Soup Company, United Airlines, Kellogg Company, Coca-Cola, Joseph Schlitz Brewing Company, Anheuser Busch, Busch Entertainment, Disney-ABC Domestic Television, Mars Incorporated, Alberto-Culver and Oprah Winfrey’s Harpo Productions (Oprah Winfrey).  In 1980, People magazine, they featured an article on Wilson.  The title was "Lookout.  A Guide To The Up And Coming."     

Wilson says, "To be successful, you have to be a chameleon. You're paid to do a job, not to be a conscience."  Wilson wrote and composed many memorable TV and Radio music spots during the commercial phase of his career. Some of the many highlights include; "I Wanna Pop, I Wanna Shasta" for Shasta Beverages, "Sweet Talker, Betty Crocker" for Betty Crocker, "Mmm, Ahh, Ohh, Pop ‘N Fresh Dough" for Pillsbury.  "Until 1981, I was known for lavish, heartwarming arrangements," says Wilson, who is a classically trained flutist with degrees in composition and orchestration. "Then I had a hit with "I Wanna Pop! I Wanna Shasta!" and suddenly I was the rock ‘n’ roll guy, the king of the synthesizers."
Wilson won a prestigious CLIO award for his arranging work on the McDonald's commercial "Makin’ Music."

Calling Me Home, Chicago

In 1985, Wilson scored a true "crossover hit" when a song he had created for Chicago Convention and Tourism Bureau and composed both lyrics and music featuring Lee Montgomery "Calling Me Home, Chicago," a song written for a $10 million state tourism campaign, became so instantly popular that it was released as a single and sold through area record stores.  Jan Zechman of Jan  Zechman Associates said, "For Chicago Tourism, our advertising agency asked six local composers to create a musical centerpiece for our campaign. We expected the competition to be fierce. It was not.  One airing of Wilson's musical vision was enough to win him the job, and to help us create one of the most memorable and successful tourism campaigns in Chicago history.  I believe in the power of words, but the power of Wilson's music, his notes, proved mightier than any pen on this day."  That song is widely regarded even today as one of the true "classic" songs of Chicago.

Ruth L. Ratny, the owner of the magazine "Screen" and editor, she wrote, "Among the most memorable for the Illinois Department of Tourism, are the unforgettable  "Calling Me Home, Chicago."  State tourism director Lynda Simon says is not surprised that Wilson was able to write words and that went a long way towards popularizing the agency's first major television campaign.  "He's a  very talented and creative person," says Simon, "and he's a joy to work with."

Recording and live performance
In 1987, because of his desire to re-enter the record business, Wilson (with attorney Linda Mensch) discovered and produced a new artist, "Nikki."  Eventually signed to Geffen Records, the debut album entitled "Nikki" was released in the summer of 1989. One song, "Notice Me" was a hit, reaching #21 on the U.S. Billboard Hot 100 and #11 on Billboard's Adult Contemporary chart, bringing Wilson honors from BMI as writer and publisher of one of the most performed songs of the year.

In early 1989, Wilson was called on by noted choral conductor Nathan Carter to orchestrate Robert Ray's "Gospel Mass" for a joint performance of the Morgan State University Choir and the Detroit Symphony.  Also in 1989, Wilson was appointed conductor/artistic director for a concert series entitled "Classic Black" (Executive Produced by Valarie Norman).  The first concert was given at Chicago's Orchestra Hall in April 1990.

Wilson wrote:

Un-D-Nyable Entertainment, Inc.

In 1997, Wilson accepted an offer from Frank Thomas, "The Big Hurt" the star player and home run hitter of the Chicago White Sox, to serve as President of Un-D-Nyable Entertainment, an independent record label.   Wilson agreed to run the label in partnership with Thomas.

 

Their initial release was a CD single entitled "3-5, The White Sox Got’em Open Up Wide," with Frank Thomas featuring D. Stoy.  Wilson discovered and signed Dejah Gomez, a precociously talented 14-year-old singer and songwriter, and hired Cleo Powell, who had an established reputation locally for recognizing and nurturing talent, as the label's A&R Director.

In 1998, Wilson hired Jun Mhoon, accomplished both as a musician and an executive at A&M Records, as Executive V.P. General Manager and Maurice White, formerly with Columbia Records, as Promotion Director and Jon Smith, Studio Manager.  He also signed Entourage (James "Slique" Adams, Floyd Massey, Eric Wade and Irone Guyton, a R&B singing group), rapper Ant-Dub and STRONG, an R&B group that was a family of five brothers. He then secured the services of songwriters/producers, Jack & Earl and George Claiborne. He soon formed an alliance with the music distributors, Navarro.

In late 1998, Wilson produced the debut CD for Dejah Gomez ("Dejah") and Entourage ("The Fall Backs of a Playa") and matching videos for the CD songs and a CD single title "I Can't Hide" featuring STRONG. In December, a single "When," by Entourage, they charted on Billboard.  Soon, both Dejah Gomez and Entourage were starting to "take off," but, in January 1999, just as the action and excitement was building for his young record company, Wilson suffered a stroke.

Health 

On January 2, 1999, the stroke left the active and energetic 46-year-old composer, producer and businessman suddenly and seriously disabled (CT).  The doctors revealed that an ischemic CVA of left MCA with hemorrhagic transformation. Wilson was told he had to accept lasting and severe restrictions on his ability to verbally communicate, due to the post-stroke condition known as Aphasia.

Aphasia is the inability to speak, read, write or understand speech.  Wilson was hospitalized at West Suburban Hospital Medical Center in Oak Park and Northwestern Memorial Hospital in Chicago. Subsequently, he went through rehabilitation at the Rehabilitation Institute of Chicago and Willowbrook.

Wilson wrote:

 

In need of a restful setting for his recuperation, Wilson and his wife, Terry, relocated to Maui in Hawaii where they lived for five years.  Wilson eventually found and studied with Dr. Walter Tokishi, a speech therapist, but the scarcity of expert medical support to help him overcome the limitations imposed by his aphasia was still a drawback of living on Maui.  In 2005, he returned to Chicago, where he began an intensive rehabilitation regimen, fiercely determined to resume his musical career.

Personal life 
Wilson has six brothers. They are:  James Warren (classical/gospel organ, piano), Herbert Liston (Acoustic/electric bass), John Oland (vocalist), Mark Andrew,  Steward Franklin
(B-3, piano). One brother, Mark, died when he was an infant due to heart complication.

Wilson has been married and divorced two times and has one stepchild:

to married Marilyn Baynes from 1978 to 1982;
to married Terry Moore from 1982 to 2005 with one stepdaughter, Carmen and one grandson.

Professional Activities & Affiliations 
He has been a Chicago Chapter Governor and National Trustee of The Recording Academy (NARAS) and active on its Education, Finance, Restructuring and Long Range Planning Committee.  In the mid-1990s, he was Chicago Chapter President of The Recording Academy and later served as a trustee of the Winans Academy of Performing Arts.

Awards
Grammy "All Out" The Winans
Clio US Television/Cinema – Best New Arrangements Of Commercial Themes – McDonald's – "Makin’ Music"
Clio 10 Awards
BMI Awards "Notice Me" - As writer and publisher of one of the most performed songs of the year.
CEBA "Family Is" - McDonald's
CEBA 8 Awards

Media 
Wilson performed with the band "The Nightclub Band" on the film, A Family Thing (Robert Duvall, James Earl Jones) which also featured the song "Family Thing Blues" on the soundtrack.  A film, "Signs," was used with Wilson's music jingle, "I Wanna Pop, I Wanna Shasta."  His song titled, "Invitation" perform by Ada Dyer, was "sample" and then used another song entitled "Brown Sugar (fine)", with the film Brown Sugar, which performed by Mos Def and produced by Kanye West. (The film's credits of  "Brown Sugar (fine)" was incorrect)

Discography 
2002: Co-writer.  Brown Sugar,  "Brown Sugar(fine)," Mos Def.  MCA.
1998: Writer, Arranger, Producer, Executive Producer.  Dejah, Dejah. Un-D-Nyable Entertainment
1998: Executive Producer.  The Fall Backs of a Playa, Entourage.  Un-D-Nyable Entertainment
1993: Arranger. "Been Good"  All Out,  The Winans, Qwest Records, R. Kelly, Producer.  Grammy Award Winning Album
1989: Co-writer, Arranger, Producer.  Nikki, debut album, Geffen.   Pop Top Twenty and BMI Award for "Notice Me."
1995: Writer, Arranger, Producer.  "Calling Me Home, Chicago."   Herschel Records.
1981: Writer, Arranger, Producer.  Dee Dee, Dee Dee Sharp Gamble, Philadelphia International Records.
1979: Writer, Arranger, Producer.  "Invitation," (title song), "Together," Norman Connors, Arista Records.
1976: Writer, Arranger, Producer.  "It All Comes Out in My Songs" (title song) and "I Still Remember How It  Used to Feel," Jerry Butler, Motown Records.
1976: Writer, Arranger, Producer.  "Music In My Dreams," "Dreams Music,"  "Ms. Fine" and "Chalk It Up," Suite for the Single Girl, Jerry Butler.  Motown Records.
1976: Writer, Arranger. "Baby I'm Still The Same Man,  James Wells. Polydor.
1975: Co-writer, Arranger.  "Weak Spot," Evelyn Thomas, Twentieth Century Records.  Top Ten Record in England.
1975: Arranger. "Your Magic Put A Spell On Me,"  L.J. Johnson,  Philips Records.
1975: Arranger. "24 Hours A Day, " Barbara Pennington."  Casablanca Records

Demography

Articles and Productions

Musicians from Chicago
1952 births
American male composers
21st-century American composers
Songwriters from Illinois
Record producers from Illinois
Jingle writers
American advertising people
American flautists
Living people
DePaul University alumni
Jingle composers
21st-century American male musicians
American male songwriters
21st-century flautists